Viktor Vasilyevich Seryogin (23 March 1944 in Tbilisi – 28 January 1992 in Shusha) was the National Hero of Azerbaijan and warrior during the First Nagorno-Karabakh War.

Early life and education 
Seryogin was born on 23 March 1944 in Tbilisi, Georgia. After completing his education at the Keremenchug Aviation School in 1986, he was appointed the pilot of Mi-2 helicopter of Zabrat separate aviation team. He made a great contribution in establishing the Azerbaijani Air Force. Seryogin was awarded the Medal "Veteran of Labour" and named the Best Pilot.

Personal life 
Seryogin was married and had two children. Due to the 2022 Russian invasion of Ukraine, the family of Seryogin, who lived in Kharkiv, were evacuated to Azerbaijan. According to his daughter Oksana, she was immediately evacuated to Chisinau, Moldova with he help of a member of the National Assembly of Azerbaijan, a member of the Azeri diaspora in Kyiv and the Azeri ambassador to Moldova.

First Nagorno-Karabakh War 
When the First Nagorno-Karabakh War started, Seryogin was appointed to the front-line. He participated in many flights to the war zone of Nagorno Karabakh and border regions of Azerbaijan. His helicopter was severely attacked and damaged by Armenian soldiers many times during his flights. The crew of the helicopter repaired it under the attacks of Armenian armed forces and continued to fulfill their assignments.

On January 28, 1992, the Azerbaijani transport helicopter Mil Mi-8 was reportedly shot down by Armenians near the town of Shusha.  Seryogin flew the burning helicopter away from the residential area. As a result he was tragically killed together with the whole crew and passengers on the board.

Honors 
Viktor Vasilyevich Seryogin was posthumously awarded the title of the "National Hero of Azerbaijan" by Presidential Decree No. 337 dated 25 November 1992.

He was buried at a Martyrs' Lane cemetery in Baku.

See also 
 First Nagorno-Karabakh War
 List of National Heroes of Azerbaijan
 Azerbaijani Air and Air Defence Force
 1992 Azerbaijani Mil Mi-8 shootdown

References

Further reading 
Vüqar Əsgərov. Azərbaycanın Milli Qəhrəmanları (kitab)|"Azərbaycanın Milli Qəhrəmanları" (Yenidən işlənmiş II nəşr). Bakı: "Dərələyəz-M", 2010, səh. 256.

1944 births
1992 deaths
Azerbaijani military personnel of the Nagorno-Karabakh War
Azerbaijani military personnel killed in action
National Heroes of Azerbaijan
Military personnel from Tbilisi